Matthew Gray is the name of:

Matthew Gray (archer) (born 1973), Australian archer
Matthew Gray (cyclist) (born 1977), Australian Paralympic cyclist
Matthew Gray (Governor of Bombay), acting governor of Bombay, 1669–1672

See also
 Matt Gray (disambiguation)